The name Paine  has been used for four tropical cyclones in the Eastern Pacific Ocean:

 Hurricane Paine (1986) – Category 2, brushed the southern Baja California peninsula before hitting Sonora; its remnants contributed to severe flooding in the South Central United States
 Hurricane Paine (1992) – Category 1, never neared land
 Hurricane Paine (2016) – Category 1, dissipated just west of the Baja California peninsula
 Tropical Storm Paine (2022) – weak tropical storm, dissipated in the open ocean

Pacific hurricane set index articles